Wells Memorial Library is a historic library building located at Upper Jay, Essex County, New York.  It was built in 1907, and is a 1 1/2-story, square, frame building with Tudor Revival and Arts and Crafts design elements.  It sits on a stone foundation and has a steep hipped roof with cross gables.  It features stucco cladding, half-timbering, and narrow banks of multi-pane windows.  An addition to the building was constructed in 2001.

It was added to the National Register of Historic Places in 2011.

References

Libraries on the National Register of Historic Places in New York (state)
Tudor Revival architecture in New York (state)
Library buildings completed in 1907
Buildings and structures in Essex County, New York
National Register of Historic Places in Essex County, New York